Alvin and the Chipmunks: The Squeakquel is a 2009 American live-action/computer-animated jukebox musical comedy film directed by Betty Thomas, written by Jon Vitti, Jonathan Aibel and Glenn Berger, and produced by Janice Karman and Ross Bagdasarian Jr.. The second installment in its live-action film series and the sequel to Alvin and the Chipmunks (2007), the film stars Zachary Levi, David Cross and Jason Lee. Justin Long, Matthew Gray Gubler and Jesse McCartney return as the Chipmunks from the previous film. Amy Poehler, Anna Faris and Christina Applegate voice the new characters, the Chipettes. The film sees the Chipmunks entering high school and being under the care of Dave Seville's cousin, Toby, while Ian Hawke recruits the Chipettes to restore his career.

Alvin and the Chipmunks:  The Squeakquel was distributed by 20th Century Fox, and produced by Fox 2000 Pictures, Regency Enterprises and Bagdasarian Productions. It was released in theaters on December 23, 2009 by 20th Century Fox to generally negative reviews from critics, grossing $443.1 million on a $70 million budget. Two sequels were later released: Chipwrecked in 2011 and The Road Chip in 2015.

Plot

David Seville is injured when a cardboard cutout of Alvin sends him flying across the stage during a charity benefit concert in Paris, France. While he recovers in a French hospital, Dave asks his aunt, Jackie, to look after the Chipmunks, Alvin, Simon, and Theodore. Arrangements are also made for them to attend West Eastman High School. After Jackie also has an accident at the airport, the Chipmunks are left in the care of Toby, Jackie's grandson and Dave's cousin.

Former JETT Records chief executive Ian Hawke, who is broke and destitute, lives in the company’s basement. Three singing female chipmunks, Brittany, Jeanette, and Eleanor, a.k.a. the Chipettes, emerge from a FedEx package. Ian recruits the Chipettes to resurrect his career.

While at school, two jealous jocks ridicule the Chipmunks and chase them around, putting Simon's head in a toilet and poking at Theodore's backside. The Chipmunks are summoned to the principal's office after attacking the jocks. The principal, Dr. Rubin, who is a fan who saw them in Denver, Colorado, enlists their help to raise money for the school's music program by participating in a contest. Ian is shocked to find the Chipmunks on the front page of his newspaper. After he reads a story about them representing the school, he enrolls the Chipettes at the same school.

When the Chipmunks meet the Chipettes, both groups are smitten with each other. However, Brittany reminds the girls that Ian said the Chipmunks betrayed him and are deemed untrustworthy. Alvin and the boys struggle to make it through a rehearsal because of their new crushes. Ian smugly walks in and introduces his new stars, the Chipettes. The boys are shocked to see the girls working with Ian, and a rivalry emerges when Ian convinces Dr. Rubin to let the Chipettes compete in the Battle of the Bands. Rubin sets up a concert for the two groups to compete to represent the school.

Alvin becomes popular with the jocks and joins the football team, not realizing that the next game is during the concert. At the concert, Theodore and Simon tell the fans that Alvin failed to show up, and they cannot perform, leading to a victory for the Chipettes. Alvin arrives after the concert to an empty auditorium, and Brittany calls him out for his lack of responsibility. Alvin returns home and unsuccessfully tries apologizing to his brothers. Theodore runs away to the Los Angeles Zoo the next day. Alvin and Simon save him from a wedge-tailed eagle, and the three make it out alive.

Soon, the Chipettes are hired but learn that they are to perform as an opening act for a Britney Spears concert on the same night as the school contest. Ian convinces them to call off the battle and perform at the concert, but refuses to give the same credit to Jeanette and Eleanor that he gives Brittany, who demands that they all perform together or not at all, until Ian intends to send them to a barbecue restaurant unless they perform.

Before the Battle of the Bands, Alvin receives a panicked phone call from the Chipettes, who tell him that Ian has locked them in a cage. Alvin goes on to rescue them while Simon tells Jeanette how to pick the lock over the phone. Simon and Theodore are on the verge of going out to perform just by themselves until the others arrive just in time to perform at the contest. The Chipmunks and the Chipettes perform together for the first time and win the money for the music program. Dave, who had left the hospital upon learning that Toby was looking after the Chipmunks, returns during the contest, happy to see the Chipmunks again, and allows the Chipettes to stay with them. Meanwhile, Ian attempts to imitate the Chipettes, only for the security guards to eject him from the arena and put him in a dumpster.

Cast

Live-action cast
 Zachary Levi as Toby Seville
 David Cross as Ian Hawke
 Jason Lee as David "Dave" Seville
 Wendie Malick as Dr. Rubin
 Anjelah Johnson as Julie Ortega
 Kevin G. Schmidt as Ryan Edwards
 Chris Warren, Jr. as Xander
 Bridgit Mendler as Becca Kingston
 Alexandra Shipp as Valentina
 Aimee Carrero as Emily
 Brando Eaton as Jeremy Smith
 Kathryn Joosten as Aunt Jackie Seville

Voice cast
 Justin Long as Alvin Seville (voice)
 Ross Bagdasarian Jr. as Alvin Seville (singing voice)
 Christina Applegate as Brittany (voice)
 Janice Karman as Brittany (singing voice)
 Matthew Gray Gubler as Simon Seville (voice)
 Steve Vining as Simon Seville (singing voice)
 Anna Faris as Jeanette (voice)
 Janice Karman as Jeanette (singing voice)
 Jesse McCartney as Theodore Seville (voice)
 Janice Karman as Theodore Seville (singing voice)
 Amy Poehler as Eleanor (voice)
 Janice Karman as Eleanor (singing voice)

Cameos
 Jake Zyrus as himself
 Honor Society as themselves
 Quest Crew as Li'l Rosero Dancers
 Eric Bauza as Digger (voice)
 Sean Astin as Meerkat Manor Narrator (voice)

Production
Originally, Dave Seville was written to have a larger role in the film, but it was reduced due to Jason Lee’s filming schedule for the fourth and final season of My Name Is Earl. During preproduction of Alvin and the Chipmunks: The Squeakquel in 2008, most of his scenes were rewritten, with much of Lee's role being replaced with Zachary Levi’s character, Toby Seville.

Reception

Box office
On its opening Wednesday, the film opened to #1 with $18.8 million and finished the weekend at #3 behind Fox's own Avatar and Warner Bros' Sherlock Holmes with $48.9 million and a $75.6 million 5-day total, eclipsing its budget in only 5 days. In the US, its the 9th highest-grossing film of 2009, and on March 7, 2010, it out-grossed its predecessor to become the second highest-grossing film to never hit #1 behind My Big Fat Greek Wedding. The Squeakquel ended its run with $219.6 million in the US and $223.5 million overseas for a total of $443.1 million worldwide.</ref>

Critical response

On Rotten Tomatoes, the film has an approval rating of 20% based on reviews from 84 critics and an average rating of 3.88/10. The site's consensus is that, "This Squeakquel may entertain the kiddies, but it's low on energy and heavily reliant on slapstick humor." On Metacritic, it has a weighted average score of 41 out of 100 based on 20 reviews, indicating "mixed or average reviews". Audiences surveyed by CinemaScore gave the film a grade A on scale of A+ to F.

Owen Gleiberman of Entertainment Weekly graded the film a C-, asking, "Will kids eat up this cutely fractious claptrap? Of course they will. They'll eat up whatever you put in front of them. But that doesn't make The Squeakquel good for them." Sue Robinson from Radio Times said that "even if there's little here for older viewers to enjoy, youngsters will love the slapstick action and catchy soundtrack."

Joe Leydon, writing for Variety, called it "a frenetic but undeniably funny follow-up that offers twice the number of singing-and-dancing rodents in another seamless blend of CGI and live-action elements." Betsy Sharkey of the Los Angeles Times commented on Betty Thomas' direction, saying that she brings "a light campy touch as she did in 1995's The Brady Bunch Movie."

After the film had garnered $112 million worldwide at the box office over its first weekend, some critics were disappointed that it was more popular than other movies in wide release aimed at a family audience. Richard Corliss of Time wrote that families "could have taken the cherubs to The Princess and the Frog or Disney's A Christmas Carol, worthy efforts that, together, took in only about a fifth of the Chipmunks' revenue in the same period".

Accolades

At the 2010 Kids' Choice Awards, Alvin and the Chipmunks: The Squeakquel won Favorite Movie. The film was one of nominees for the "Family" category at the 2010 National Movie Awards, losing to Harry Potter and the Half-Blood Prince (2009). Music supervisor Julianne Jordan won the Guild of Music Supervisors Award for Best Music Supervision for a Film in 2011. At the 2010 British Academy Children's Awards, The Squeakquel won BAFTA Kid's Vote (Feature Film).

Soundtrack

Alvin and the Chipmunks: The Squeakquel: Original Motion Picture Soundtrack is the soundtrack based on the film. It was released on December 1, 2009. Bands Honor Society  and Queensberry, along with Filipino singer Charice, were all featured artists for both the movie and soundtrack.

Track listing

Charts

Weekly charts

Year-end charts

Certifications

Marketing

Video game

Alvin and the Chipmunks: The Squeakquel is a video game based on the movie. It was released on December 1, 2009 (the same day as the movie's soundtrack) for the Wii and Nintendo DS.

Home media
Alvin and the Chipmunks: The Squeakquel was released on DVD/Blu-ray/digital copy on March 30, 2010 in North America, on April 12, 2010 in the United Kingdom and on June 2, 2010 in Australia.

Sequels

Shortly after the film's release on DVD and Blu-ray, Fox and Regency had announced that Alvin and the Chipmunks 3D was scheduled to be released on December 16, 2011. The title was then changed to Alvin and the Chipmunks: Chipwrecked. On January 22, 2011, Fox 2000 Pictures started production on the film during a Caribbean cruise on the Carnival Dream ship. Filming took place primarily on the ship's upper, open decks with scenes featuring actor Jason Lee (reprising his role as David Seville) and the antics of The Chipmunks in the Carnival Dream's outdoor recreation areas. Stops on the itinerary included Cozumel, Roatan, Belize and Costa Maya (which provided tropical backdrops for many of the film's shipboard scenes). A fourth film, Alvin and the Chipmunks: The Road Chip, was released on December 18, 2015.

Notes

References

External links

 
 
 
 
 

Alvin and the Chipmunks films
2009 films
2009 soundtrack albums
2000s musical comedy films
20th Century Fox films
American fantasy films
American musical comedy films
American sequel films
American films with live action and animation
Dune Entertainment films
Films directed by Betty Thomas
Live-action films based on animated series
Films set in Los Angeles
Films set in Paris
Films set in Mexico City
Films shot in California
Films shot in France
Films shot in Mexico
Regency Enterprises films
Films scored by David Newman
Films with screenplays by Jonathan Aibel and Glenn Berger
2009 comedy films
Films produced by Ross Bagdasarian Jr.
Films produced by Janice Karman
2000s English-language films
2000s American films